Graham Settree is a former professional rugby league footballer who played in the 1980s and 1990s. He played for the Parramatta Eels from 1985 to 1988, the Penrith Panthers in 1989 and finally the Newcastle Knights in 1990.

Playing career
Settree made his first grade debut for Parramatta in Round 1 1985 against St George which ended in a 26–6 loss.

In 1989, Settree joined Penrith but made only two appearances for the club before signing with Newcastle.  Settree managed the same number of appearances for Newcastle and retired at the end of 1990.

Post playing
Settree is now a keen surf boat rower in the masters category, competing at state and national level, for Avoca Beach.  He is a three-time Australian medalist most recently with a third in the team over 180 years at the 2018 Aussies in Perth.

References

External links
http://www.rugbyleagueproject.org/players/Graham_Settree/summary.html

Australian rugby league players
Parramatta Eels players
Penrith Panthers players
Newcastle Knights players
Living people
Year of birth missing (living people)
Place of birth missing (living people)
Rugby league second-rows